See Rogation days for usage pertaining to the Christian calendar of the Western Church.
 
In Roman constitutional law, rogatio is the term (from Latin  rogo, "ask, place a question before") for a legislative bill placed before an Assembly of the People in ancient Rome. The rogatio procedure underscores the fact that the Roman Senate could issue decrees, but was not a legislative or parliamentarian body. Only the People could pass legislation.

A magistrate with the right to summon the assembly could propose a bill (rogatio legis); the proposed laws themselves were leges rogatae. A bill's proposer was its lator; a supporter was an auctor. Discussions in the senate would contribute to the drafting of a bill, which would be published (promulgare rogationem, that is, promulgatio) three weeks or more before it was formally submitted to the assembly. During this period, citizens could discuss the bill and propose changes, or more rarely ask for its withdrawal, at informal sessions (contiones). After the bill had been brought before the assembly for the vote, it could no longer be modified.

The legislator who introduced the bill asked Velitis iubeatis, Quirites? ("Citizens, are you going to approve and order?") and the people responded yea or nay without discussion. If a bill was withdrawn after the rogatio but before the vote was taken, it was usually because a tribune threatened to use his veto power against it, or less frequently because it proved unpopular among the plebs. If a bill was passed (rogatio lata est), it became a law (lex) after the presiding magistrate made a formal announcement (renuntiatio) of the assembly's decision.

In the Early Republic, the Senate had to approve the constitutionality of a law before it was enacted; after the passage of the Lex Publilia Philonis in 339 BC, which required that at least one of the two censores be a plebeian, this approval (patrum auctoritas) was required before the bill was put to a vote in the assembly. With controversial popularist measures, however, the Senate was sometimes bypassed. 
If a bill was proposed for the purpose of declaring war, it had to be brought before the Centuriate Assembly.

A bill that became law was inscribed on copper or marble tablets and kept in the state treasury (aerarium populi romani) under the supervision of the quaestors.

In 63 BC, Cicero managed to obstruct a rogatio Servilia by making a speech before the people; this appears to be the only time in the Late Republic when oratory blocked a popular piece of legislation, which in this case had provided for the distribution of land to the poor. Or so Cicero claims; the bill's sponsor, the tribune Servilius Rullus, more likely withdrew it because of the threat of veto from one of his fellow tribunes, and it never reached the comitia.

See also
 Rogatio Aufidia de ambitu

References

Roman Republic
Roman law
Legal history
Parliamentary procedure
Proposed laws